Jean Pierre Clar (born 27 February 1942), also known by the nicknames of "Jap", "Nam", "Le chinois" ("The Chinese") and "Tronche d'obus" ("Howitzer head"), is a French former professional rugby league and amateur rugby union footballer who played in the 1950s, 1960s and 1970s. 

Background
Jean-Pierre Clar born in Hanoi, French Indochina from a French father and a Vietnamese mother.

As a player, he is considered not very heavy, neither very fast, but having  "a style at any speed of execution as he was technically to the point"

He debuted in rugby league for Villeneuve XIII alongside his brother Christian, before returning there after his rugby union period. In fact, he played three seasons for SU Agen, winning a French Championship title in 1962. With Villeneuve, he won the French Championship in 1964. Called up for the France national team, he earned 34 caps between 1965 and 72. 

One of his notable feats was on 6 March 1967 during a match against Great Britain national team in Wigan, a match where he exemplified himself by his pugnacity and his resistance to bad gestures from opposing players (notably, from Bill Bryant) which would earn him the applause of the British public at the end of the match.

Outside the field, he is a company manager, after working as a "locksmith welder".

References

1942 births
Living people
France national rugby league team captains
France national rugby league team players
French people of Vietnamese descent
French rugby league players
French rugby union players
Rugby league hookers
Rugby league locks
Rugby union flankers
Sportspeople from Hanoi
Villeneuve Leopards players
SU Agen Lot-et-Garonne players